Bird Song: Live 1971 is a live album by the psychedelic folk band The Holy Modal Rounders, released on April 20, 2004, through Water Records.

Track listing 
All songs are traditional, except where noted.

Personnel 
The Holy Modal Rounders
Peter Stampfel – fiddle, vocals
Steve Weber – guitar, vocals
The Clamtones
Ted Deane – saxophone, clarinet, flute
Roger North – drums
Dave Reisch – bass guitar
Robin Remaily – mandolin, guitar, fiddle, vocals
Richard Tyler – keyboards

Additional musicians and production
Four Finger Lyd – design
Gary Hobish – mastering
Pat Thomas – production

References 

2004 live albums
The Holy Modal Rounders albums
Don Giovanni Records albums